Oncideres angaturama is a species of beetle in the family Cerambycidae. It was described by Galileo and Martins in 2008. It is known from Peru.

References

angaturama
Beetles described in 2008